The domain name net is a generic top-level domain (gTLD) used in the Domain Name System of the Internet. The name is derived from the word network, indicating it was originally intended for organizations involved in networking technologies, such as Internet service providers and other infrastructure companies. However, there are no official restrictions and the domain is now a general-purpose namespace.

History

Verisign, the operator of  after acquiring Network Solutions, held an operations contract that expired on 30 June 2005. ICANN, the organization responsible for domain management, sought proposals from organizations to operate the domain upon expiration of the contract. Verisign regained the contract bid and secured its control over the  registry for another six years.
On 30 June 2011, the contract with Verisign was automatically renewed for another six years. This is because of a resolution approved by the ICANN board, which states that renewal will be automatic as long as Verisign meets certain ICANN requirements. As of May 2022, Verisign continues to manage .net.

Registration
Registrations are processed via accredited registrars and internationalized domain names are also accepted.

The first created .net domain name is nordu.net. It was created on 1 January 1985 according to the public records, and NORDUnet has used this domain name since 1985.

Net extension is the most preferred gTLD just after com. Total registered domain names with net extension are 13.4 million according to the Domain Name Industry Report published in March 2020, which publishes every quarter.

References

External links
 List of  accredited registrars

Generic top-level domains
Council of European National Top Level Domain Registries members
Computer-related introductions in 1985